The 2016 Korea National League, also known as the Incheon International Airport National League 2016 due to the sponsorship of Incheon International Airport, was the 14th season of the Korea National League, the third tier of South Korea's football league system. Each of the ten clubs played three times against all other clubs in the regular season, and the top four clubs of the regular season qualified for post-season playoffs.

Hyundai Mipo Dockyard won their seventh league title after winning the two-legged final, but they dissolved their football club after the end of the season due to financial difficulties. Yongin City also dissolved their football club after being disappointed with poor results of the club.

Gangneung City goalkeeper Park Chung-hyo became the first player to win the MVP award without the league title.

Teams

Regular season

League table

Positions by matchday

Championship playoffs

See also
2016 in South Korean football
2016 Korea National League Championship
2016 Korean FA Cup

References

External links

Korea National League seasons
2016 in South Korean football
2016 domestic association football leagues